Devil's Got a New Disguise may refer to:

 Devil's Got a New Disguise: The Very Best of Aerosmith, a compilation album by Aerosmith
 "Devil's Got a New Disguise" (song), a song by Aerosmith